Red Oak Creek is a stream in the U.S. state of West Virginia.

Red Oak Creek was named for the red oak trees which once lined its banks.

See also
List of rivers of West Virginia

References

Rivers of Grant County, West Virginia
Rivers of West Virginia